Oded Gavish (born June 23, 1989) is an Israeli footballer (Defender).

Career

Club
Gavish grew up in the Maccabi Petah Tikva youth academy. He played for two seasons at Maccabi Herzliya in the Israeli second division. In June 2010 Gavish signed a four year contract with Hapoel Be'er Sheva.

References

1989 births
Living people
Israeli footballers
Maccabi Petah Tikva F.C. players
Maccabi Herzliya F.C. players
Hapoel Be'er Sheva F.C. players
Śląsk Wrocław players
Maccabi Netanya F.C. players
Hapoel Petah Tikva F.C. players
Maccabi Sha'arayim F.C. players
Hapoel Ashkelon F.C. players
Israeli Premier League players
Liga Leumit players
Expatriate footballers in Poland
Israeli expatriate sportspeople in Poland
Footballers from Tel Aviv
Israeli people of Romanian-Jewish descent
Association football central defenders